Elections for four seats in the United States House of Representatives in Florida for the 64th Congress were held November 3, 1914.

Background
In 1912, Florida gained a fourth seat following reapportionment after the 1910 census. The previous year had seen an unusual 5-way race in one district and the at-large seat and a 4-way race in the other two districts. In 1914, in contrast, there was little opposition in the general election

Democratic Primaries
The Democratic primaries were held June 2, 1914.  The incumbent in the former  ran unsuccessfully for the nomination in the new 4th district.

General Election results

See also
United States House of Representatives elections, 1914

References

1914
Florida
United States House of Representatives